The Lascivious Costume Ball is an annual masquerade ball held by the University of Chicago in Ida Noyes Hall. Founded by students in 1970, it was created as a rejection of the Washington Promenade, a formal dance held since 1903. Students would pay no fee if they came in the nude, half price for wearing a lascivious costume, and full price for remaining in "street clothes". It was held irregularly between 1970 and 1984 and was cancelled by school president Hanna Holborn Gray after that year's ball sent numerous students to the emergency room and provoked negative publicity. It was revived as an annual event in 2008 as a celebration of sexual diversity.

References

Bibliography

University of Chicago
Masquerade balls
1970 establishments in Illinois
1984 disestablishments in Illinois
2008 establishments in Illinois
Recurring events established in 1970
Recurring events disestablished in 1984
Recurring events established in 2008